Scorpiurus may refer to:

Scorpiurus, a genus of flies
Scorpiurus, a genus of plants